France competed at the 1932 Summer Olympics in Los Angeles, United States. 103 competitors, 97 men and 6 women, took part in 56 events in 13 sports.

Medalists

Athletics

Boxing

Cycling

Eight cyclists, all men, represented France in 1932.

Individual road race
 Paul Chocque
 Amédée Fournier
 Henri Mouillefarine
 Georges Conan

Team road race
 Paul Chocque
 Amédée Fournier
 Henri Mouillefarine

Sprint
 Louis Chaillot

Time trial
 Charles Rampelberg

Tandem
 Maurice Perrin
 Louis Chaillot

Team pursuit
 Amédée Fournier
 René Le Grevès
 Henri Mouillefarine
 Paul Chocque

Diving

Equestrian

Fencing

Eleven fencers, ten men and a woman, represented France in 1932.

Men's foil
 René Bougnol
 Philippe Cattiau
 Edward Gardère

Men's team foil
 Edward Gardère, René Lemoine, René Bondoux, René Bougnol, Philippe Cattiau, Jean Piot

Men's épée
 Georges Buchard
 Bernard Schmetz
 Philippe Cattiau

Men's team épée
 Fernand Jourdant, Bernard Schmetz, Georges Tainturier, Georges Buchard, Jean Piot, Philippe Cattiau

Men's sabre
 Edward Gardère
 Jean Piot

Women's foil
 Jeanne Vical

Modern pentathlon

One male pentathlete represented France in 1932.

 Ivan Duranthon

Rowing

Sailing

Swimming

Weightlifting

Wrestling

Art competitions

References

External links

Official Olympic Reports
International Olympic Committee results database

Nations at the 1932 Summer Olympics
1932
Summer Olympics